The Schwarz Group is a family-owned multinational retail group that operates grocery shops under the Lidl and Kaufland brands. It is the largest European retailer and the fourth-largest retailer in the world by revenue. The Schwarz Group stores sell mostly private label brands and the Schwarz group also operates its own production facilities for baking goods, soft drinks, and ice cream.

History
Schwarz Group was founded by Josef Schwarz (1903–1977), father of Dieter Schwarz, in 1930. It is headquartered in Neckarsulm, Baden-Württemberg, Germany. The Schwarz Group is an international trading company with 500,000 employees and operates over 12,900 stores in 2021 across 33 countries. It is made up of the two retail divisions Lidl and Kaufland. In addition to the retail business, the Schwarz Group also owns brands in the beverages, baked goods, sweets, and ice cream sectors. The Schwarz Group has been involved in the collection, sorting, and recycling of recyclable materials for many years. With the Dieter Schwarz Foundation, the company supports education primarily in Dieter Schwarz's hometown Heilbronn.

The company had a €125.3 billion turnover in the 2020/2021 fiscal year.

References

Privately held companies of Germany
Retail companies of Germany
Companies based in Baden-Württemberg
Companies based in Neckarsulm